Mesovelia is a genus of water treaders in the family Mesoveliidae. There are more than 30 described species in Mesovelia.

Species
These 33 species belong to the genus Mesovelia:

 Mesovelia amoena Uhler, 1894
 Mesovelia bila Jaczewski, 1928
 Mesovelia blissi Drake, 1949
 Mesovelia cryptophila Hungerford, 1924
 Mesovelia dentiventris Linnavuori, 1971
 Mesovelia dominicana Garrouste & Nel, 2010
 Mesovelia easaci Jehamalar & Chandra, 2017
 Mesovelia ebbenielseni Andersen & Weir, 2004
 Mesovelia egorovi Kanyukova, 1981
 Mesovelia furcata Mulsant & Rey, 1852
 Mesovelia hackeri Harris & Drake, 1941
 Mesovelia halirrhyta J. Polhemus, 1975
 Mesovelia hambletoni Drake & Harris, 1946
 Mesovelia hilrrhyta Polhemus
 Mesovelia horvathi Lundblad, 1933
 Mesovelia hovarthi Lundblad, 1933
 Mesovelia hungerfordi Hale, 1926
 Mesovelia indica Horváth, 1915
 Mesovelia kumaria Jehamalar & Chandra, 2017
 Mesovelia lillyae Jehamalar & Chandra, 2017
 Mesovelia melanesica J. Polhemus & D. Polhemus, 2000
 Mesovelia miyamotoi Kerzhner, 1977
 Mesovelia mulsanti White, 1879 (Mulsant's water treader)
 Mesovelia pacifica Usinger, 1946
 Mesovelia polhemusi Spangler, 1990
 Mesovelia stysi J. Polhemus & D. Polhemus, 2000
 Mesovelia subvittata Horváth, 1915
 Mesovelia thermalis Horváth, 1915
 Mesovelia thomasi Hungerford, 1951
 Mesovelia tuberculata Floriano & Moreira in Floriano et al., 2016
 Mesovelia ujhelyii Lundblad, 1933
 Mesovelia vittigera Horváth, 1895
 Mesovelia zeteki Harris & Drake, 1941

References

Further reading

External links

 

Gerromorpha genera
Articles created by Qbugbot
Mesoveliidae